The 32nd Division was one of the divisions of the Spanish Republican Army that were organized during the Spanish Civil War on the basis of the Mixed Brigades. It was deployed on the Aragon and Segre fronts.

History 
The unit was created on April 28, 1937, as a reserve division of the Eastern Army. Subsequently, the 32nd Division was integrated into the XI Army Corps, being placed in the rear. Command of the unit fell to Alfonso Arana Vivanco, who was replaced in July 1937 by Manuel Gancedo Sáenz.

During the Aragon Offensive, the 32nd Division was forced to withdraw, establishing its new defensive positions on the Segre front . On September 8, 1938, the forces of the unit relieved the 55th Division in the Agramunt-Artesa de Segre-Tornabous sector. After the start of the Catalonia Offensive the 32nd Division, faced with strong enemy pressure, was forced to withdraw. In the course of the fighting, it suffered a severe loss. In January 1939 it was briefly added to the X Army Corps, although during the rest of the campaign it did not play a relevant role and ended up withdrawing to the French border.

Command 
 Commanders
 Alfonso Arana Vivanco;
 Manuel Gancedo Sáenz;

 Commissars
 Cristóbal Albadetrecu, of the CNT;
 Francisco Señer Martín, of the CNT;
 Andrés Semitiel Rubio, of the PSOE;

 Chiefs of Staff
 Emilio Bosch Montes;
 Felipe Félix Moreno Gómez;

Order of battle

References

Bibliography 
 
  
 
 
 
 

Military units and formations established in 1937
Military units and formations disestablished in 1939
Divisions of Spain
Military units and formations of the Spanish Civil War
Military history of Spain
Armed Forces of the Second Spanish Republic